"Touch the Sun" is a single from Kero Kero Bonito vocalist Sarah Midori Perry's solo project Cryalot, released 27 July 2022 by AWAL. The song is the second single from Cryalot's upcoming debut EP Icarus, and like the lead single "Hell Is Here", it was co-written by Perry and producer Jennifer Walton. "Touch the Sun" was released alongside a music video directed by Perry.

Style 
Per BroadwayWorlds Michael Major, "Touch the Sun" is "a colorful, ethereal track pinned down by absorbing hyper-pop electronics and delicate vocals" which "crystallizes the intense dichotomy that exists within the Cryalot universe with the trippy self-directed accompanying visuals providing further stark contrast to striking debut single "Hell Is Here"." Stereogums James Rettig called it "brighter and sweeter than its predecessor." Rolling Stones Selim Bulut called it a "flash of brightness" and a "cathartic release" amongst "all the EP's dark moments".

Per Perry, "Touch the Sun" "is about the feeling of being invincible and the unshakable belief that you can overcome any difficulties" and "depicts the beginning of the Icarus story; celebrating the courage when he decides to take flight, the excitement of breaking free and knowing that leap of faith is worth all the risks."

References 

2022 singles
2022 songs
Cryalot songs
AWAL singles
Hyperpop songs